Lester Wong (born 28 August 1944) is a Canadian fencer. He competed in the individual and team foil and épée events at the 1972 Summer Olympics.

References

1944 births
Living people
Canadian male épée fencers
Olympic fencers of Canada
Fencers at the 1972 Summer Olympics
Fencers at the 1970 British Commonwealth Games
Chinese emigrants to Canada
Canadian sportspeople of Chinese descent
Commonwealth Games medallists in fencing
Commonwealth Games silver medallists for Canada
Commonwealth Games bronze medallists for Canada
Canadian male foil fencers
Medallists at the 1970 British Commonwealth Games